Jesse Hendrix (born August 19, 1982 in Lakewood, Washington) is a former Canadian football defensive back. He was signed by the BC Lions as an undrafted free agent in 2006. He played college football at Eastern Washington.

Hendrix has also played for the Spokane Shock and Montreal Alouettes.

External links
Just Sports Stats
Montreal Alouettes bio

1982 births
Living people
People from Lakewood, Washington
American football cornerbacks
American players of Canadian football
Canadian football defensive backs
Eastern Washington Eagles football players
BC Lions players
Spokane Shock players
Montreal Alouettes players